Parth Jindal (born 19 May 1990) is an Indian businessman and scion of JSW Group.

Early life and education 
Jindal is the youngest of three children of Sajjan Jindal and Sangita Jindal. Jindal earned his MBA from Harvard Business School in 2016 and his BA in Economics and Political Science from Brown University in 2012. He is also an alumnus of Cathedral and John Connon School from Mumbai and Sevenoaks School in England.

Career  

He joined the JSW Group as an economic analyst in 2012 and also did a secondment with JFE Steel Japan for six months. Prior to that, he worked with Falcon Edge Capital, a hedge fund in New York City. At JSW Group, he was given the role of economic analyst and was tasked with taking charge of all strategic projects. As a result, he was instrumental in developing a new retail strategy for JSW Steel and turning around several of the group's loss-making subsidiaries, including JSW Cement and JSW Steel USA.

Jindal led a group that built a 2.3 million-ton auto-grade steel plant in Vijaynagar, Bellary before he went to Harvard University in 2014 to get his MBA. At that time, the plant was dubbed the first Indian steel establishment to manufacture auto steel because, until that time, all major Indian car makers were importing high-quality steel for car panels from South Korea, Japan, or Germany.

JSW Cement 
Parth Jindal was appointed managing director of JSW Cement in June 2014 and is aiming to expand from 14 MPTA to a 20 Million MPTA target by December 2021. JSW Cement currently makes two variants of Green Cement products – JSW Cement Portland Slag Cement and Concreel HD.

Under Parth's leadership the company has invested US$150 Million in Fujairah, to set-up a one million tonne per annum clinker unit to achieve its 2020 targets. Through this investment Parth hopes to contribute to the overall economic development of Fujairah as well as create new direct and indirect job opportunities.

In February 2022, Jindal was appointed as a chair at Global Cement & Concrete Association (GCCA) India.

JSW Energy 
On 23 December 2022, JSW Energy got approval from the firm's shareholders to appoint Parth Jindal to a director position on the board of the company.

JSW USA 
Jindal is the Director of JSW USA. Under his guidance, JSW Steel has made a US$1 Billion Commitment to be split evenly between US Operations in Texas and in Ohio. An investment that was welcomed by US President Donald Trump. On investments in JSW USA, Parth shared that access to natural gas at extremely economical prices and the abundant availability of scrap steel in Texas made conditions very conducive for manufacturing through the Electric Art Furnace Route. The investments also guaranteed over 1000 jobs in the industry.

According to Jindal, the organisation has totally severed ties with Chinese suppliers, with the exception of two products that are sold exclusively by China. He stated that suppliers to Group who get more than twenty percent of their sourcing from China are also prohibited from doing business with the company unless and until they can demonstrate that investments have been made to lower the amount of goods they buy from China.

JSW Paints 
Jindal is managing director of JSW Paints. The JSW Group formally announced the launch of JSW Paints on 2 May 2019. The company is aiming to achieve Rs. 20 billion revenue mark by 2022. The company has built two facilities – a 25,000 kilo litres coil coating facility at Vasind in Maharashtra for industrial demand and another 10,000 kilo litre water-based decorative paints facility in Vijayanagar in Karnataka. The Vijayanagar plant was inaugurated on 27 January 2020.

The company offers a complete range of environment friendly water-based paints for interior and exterior walls, wood and metal.

Jindal defended a proposed investment of ₹750 crore by group firm JSW Steel, arguing that the proposed investment was a transaction between two independent parties and that it was concluded after considerable consideration.

JSW Sports 
Parth is the Director of JSW Sports, that currently runs the ISL Football Club Bengaluru FC, Delhi based IPL Team Delhi Capitals and the Inspire Institute of Sport. In 2018, JSW Sport acquired 50% stake of the Delhi Capitals from GMR Group and Jindal was appointed Chairman of the IPL team.

JSW Sports also runs the Sports Excellence Program that provides training to elite Indian Olympic Athletes and also manages their commercial interests.

In 2018, JSW Sports won the FICCI India Sports Awards in the category of Best Company promoting sports and was also awarded the Rashtriya Khel Protsahan Puruskar by the Government of India.

In December 2021, Jindal raised his concern that the Indian Premier League authorities reconsider the franchise's auction process, which he believes does not adequately compensate the franchise for its efforts in developing young players, assembling a squad, and losing them after three years.

In January 2023, Jindal's Delhi Capital of the IPL acquired the Delhi franchise of the Women's Premier League.

Inspire Institute of Sport 
Parth Jindal is the founder of the Inspire Institute of Sport (IIS) in Vijayanagara district that was formally launched on 15 August 2018. Spread across 42 acres, the Institute aims to provide a world class training centre which can provide Indian athletes access to the most advanced infrastructure, coaching and sports science within the country. It is an initiative led by the JSW Group.

IIS has been recognised by the Sports Authority of India as a Khelo India accredited development centre for Boxing and Wrestling. The initiative is also supported by CSR funding from a number of Indian and International corporates.

JSW Venture Fund
Jindal also oversees the Management of JSW Venture Fund.

Other ventures
Jindal's wife Anushree Jindal oversees a micro-finance venture, Svamaan Financial Services, that is 100% owned by the couple.

Philanthropy

Project Yashoda 
Jindal was in charge of supervising the creation of an Android-based mobile application that can track the developmental indicators of children under six. The local women, given the moniker "Yashodas" after a figure from Hindu mythology, were instructed to take photographs of the mother and child using their mobile phones, scan the mother and child's irises, and enter the necessary information into the application. This app enables real-time, GPS-enabled tracking of children's nutrition and growth markers, making it possible for medical professionals and government officials to take appropriate follow-up action when required. Consequently, the prevalence of malnutrition in the three talukas of Palghar in which the JSW Foundation is active has significantly decreased. In 2014, then-Chief Minister Devendra Fadnavis of Maharashtra gave the order for the technology to be implemented throughout the state.

Personal life 
Parth is married to Anushree Jindal (née Jasani). They have a daughter born in April 2019.

Awards and recognition 

 GQ's 50 most influential Indians in 2018. 
 Jashn E Youngistan 2018.
 2019 Economic Times Awards 40 under Forty.

References

External links
 JSW Group – Official Website

1990 births
Living people
Brown University alumni
Businesspeople from Bangalore
Indian chief executives
Indian venture capitalists
Harvard Business School alumni
People educated at Sevenoaks School
JSW Group
Jindal family